The 2011 Men's Asian Champions Trophy was the first edition of the Men's Asian Champions Trophy and it took place from 3 September to 11 September 2011 in Ordos, China.

The top six teams (India, South Korea, Pakistan, China, Malaysia and Japan) from the 2010 Asian Games participated in the tournament which involved round-robin league among all teams followed by play-offs for final positions. The tournament was combined with the 2nd Women's Asian Champions Trophy.

The tie-breaker in a knockout match was a one on one between the striker and the goalkeeper. The striker had to start from the 23-meter line and was given only eight seconds to score. This way of tie-breaker was used as part of a testing phase by FIH.

India won the tournament after defeating Pakistan in the final. The Indians won 4-2 in a penalty shootout after regulation and extra time ended scoreless, and became the first champion of the tournament.

Teams

Results

Preliminary round

Classification round

Fifth place game

Third place game

Final

Statistics

Final standings

Goalscorers

See also
2011 Women's Asian Champions Trophy
2011 Men's Hockey Champions Trophy

References

Men's Asian Champions Trophy
International field hockey competitions hosted by China
Asian Champions Trophy
Asian Champions Trophy
Asian Champions Trophy
Ordos City